Kathleen Miller may refer to:

 Kathleen Miller (scientist), climate scientist
 Kathleen Miller (swimmer) (1909–1963), New Zealand swimmer
 Kathleen Miller (actress) (1945–2016), American actress